Rousta may refer to:

 Ali Asghar Modir-Rousta, a retired Iranian football striker and now coach
 Homa Rousta, an Iranian film and stage actress

See also 

 Rosta (disambiguation)
 Roosta (disambiguation)
 Rustah (disambiguation)